Bicycle Casino is a gambling game developed by American studio Leaping Lizard and published by Activision Value on October 26, 2004.

Reception

Bicycle Casino received mixed reviews from critics upon release. On Metacritic, the game holds a score of 49/100 based on 8 reviews, indicating "generally unfavorable reviews."

Hilary Goldstein of IGN gave the game a 3.7/10, criticizing it for its poor graphics, animations and AI while calling it a "laughable experience and not one worth $30."

References

2004 video games
Activision games
Xbox games
Xbox-only games
Digital card games
Casino video games
Video games developed in the United States